Cola Cola jazz is a novel by Togolese author Kangni Alem. It won the Grand prix littéraire d'Afrique noire in 2003.

Togolese novels
2002 novels
French-language novels
Grand prix littéraire d'Afrique noire winners